U Nārada (1868–1955), also Mingun Jetawun Sayādaw or Mingun Jetavana Sayādaw, was a Burmese monk in the Theravada tradition credited with being one of the key figures in the revival of Vipassana meditation.

His prominent students, particularly Mahasi Sayadaw, helped popularize what is now known as the "New Burmese Method" or the "Mahasi method." Sayadaw is a Burmese term of respect when addressing major Buddhist monks and means "great master".

Creation of the New Burmese method
Nyanaponika Thera, himself a student of Mahasi Sayadaw, describes the manner in which U Nārada developed the New Burmese Method:

References

Theravada Buddhist monks
1868 births
1955 deaths
Burmese Buddhist monks
Burmese philosophers
Burmese scholars of Buddhism